Oak Grove is an unincorporated community in Clackamas County, Oregon, United States, in the Portland metropolitan area. For statistical purposes, the United States Census Bureau has defined Oak Grove as a census-designated place (CDP). The census definition of the area may not precisely correspond to local understanding of the area with the same name. The population was 16,629 at the 2010 census.

History

Oak Grove was named at the suggestion of Edward W. Cornell, a member of the surveying party that platted the townsite in the 1890s. The company that was developing the property had not been able to come up with a good name for the place, and Cornell suggested "Oak Grove" after a crew ate lunch in a stand of oak trees in the northwestern part of the tract.

The area was served first from the Milwaukie post office. In 1904, Creighton post office was established, named for Susan Creighton, on whose donation land claim the office stood. Postal authorities did not name the office "Oak Grove" in order to avoid duplication. There had once been an Oak Grove post office in Josephine County. The first postmaster was noted Oregon botanist Thomas J. Howell.

Oak Grove railroad station was originally named "Center", and another station, St. Theresa, was originally named "Oak Grove". In order to prevent confusion, in 1907 the Post Office Department changed the name of the post office to "Oak Grove", and the Center railroad station was renamed to match. The railroad no longer passes through the community.

Concord School is a historic building and former school (Concord Elementary School) in Oak Grove.

Oak Grove is home to a LINCC library operated by Clackamas County.

Geography
Oak Grove is located in northwestern Clackamas County, bordered to the north by the city of Milwaukie, to the east by unincorporated Oatfield, to the south by unincorporated Jennings Lodge, and to the west by the Willamette River, whose opposite shore hosts the cities of West Linn and Lake Oswego. Oregon Route 99E runs through Oak Grove as McLoughlin Boulevard; it leads north  to downtown Portland and south  to Oregon City.

Hog Island, an island in the Willamette River, is located within the boundaries of Oak Grove.

Demographics

As of the census of 2000, there were 12,808 people, 5,641 households, and 3,249 families residing in the CDP. The population density was 4,379.6 people per square mile (1,693.6/km2). There were 6,015 housing units at an average density of 2,056.8/sq mi (795.3/km2). The racial makeup of the CDP was 91.47% White, 0.56% African American, 0.78% Native American, 1.79% Asian, 0.10% Pacific Islander, 2.55% from other races, and 2.75% from two or more races. Hispanic or Latino of any race were 5.89% of the population.

There were 5,641 households, out of which 24.7% had children under the age of 18 living with them, 43.9% were married couples living together, 9.9% had a female householder with no husband present, and 42.4% were non-families. 35.2% of all households were made up of individuals, and 18.8% had someone living alone who was 65 years of age or older. The average household size was 2.24 and the average family size was 2.89.

In the CDP, the population was spread out, with 21.5% under the age of 18, 7.5% from 18 to 24, 27.5% from 25 to 44, 23.3% from 45 to 64, and 20.2% who were 65 years of age or older. The median age was 40 years. For every 100 females, there were 89.0 males. For every 100 females age 18 and over, there were 85.8 males.

The median income for a household in the CDP was $40,530, and the median income for a family was $49,141. Males had a median income of $36,867 versus $29,877 for females. The per capita income for the CDP was $22,643. About 6.6% of families and 8.8% of the population were below the poverty line, including 14.1% of those under age 18 and 7.0% of those age 65 or over.

See also
 Southeast Park Avenue station

References

External links

 "Early days and ways in and around Milwaukie", 1939 interview of Harvey Starkweather
 Oak Grove Community Council

 
1890s establishments in Oregon
Census-designated places in Clackamas County, Oregon
Census-designated places in Oregon
Populated places on the Willamette River
Unincorporated communities in Clackamas County, Oregon
Unincorporated communities in Oregon